Ben Cunningham (born 1947 in Sheffield, Alabama) is a Gallatin, Tennessee real estate investor and founder and spokesman of the grassroots political group Tennessee Tax Revolt, Inc.

Cunningham is a Republican, but his group includes many Libertarians and conservative Democrats.  The group is a result of the attempt to implement a state income tax during the administration of former governor of Tennessee Don Sundquist.

Cunningham was an early developer of infrastructure for what became the Internet and established a computer bulletin board service called Nashville Exchange. Cunningham sold the bulletin board service for a sum which enabled him to become a major real estate investor in the Nashville market. He has stated that his opposition to the state income tax is primarily a philosophical one and that he desires to limit the growth of government.

Cunnigham and his group advocate a "Taxpayer Bill of Rights" which would amend the Tennessee Constitution in a manner similar to that done in Colorado in the 1990s.  Their plan would require that any tax increase resulting in an increase of revenues to state government growing at a rate faster than the combined rate of population increase and the cost of living index be subjected to a referendum.

While considered highly unlikely to be enacted by the Tennessee state legislature in the near future, the concept has already been accepted by the city of Spring Hill, Tennessee, home of Saturn Corporation.  Cunningham and his supporters trumpet the high rate of growth of this jurisdiction, which has resulted in tax reductions in each of the last five years.  The "Bill of Rights" concept is being pushed for by advocates in several other jurisdictions in Tennessee as well.

References

1947 births
Living people
People from Sheffield, Alabama
People from Gallatin, Tennessee
Direct democracy activists
Tennessee Republicans